David Bach may refer to:

 David Bach (author) (born 1966), American financial columnist and author
 David Bach (musician), American bass guitarist
 David Bach (poker player), American professional poker player
 David Josef Bach (1874–1947), Vienna cultural figure